was the fourth son of Tokugawa Ieyasu with his concubine Saigo-no-Tsubone. His Childhood name was Fukumatsumaru (福松丸).

When his mother died, he and his brother were adopted by Acha no Tsubone (1555-1637). His full brother, Tokugawa Hidetada, was the second shōgun.  Later, Tadayoshi was adopted by Matsudaira Ietada and succeeded him as the second lord of Oshi Domain.

At the Battle of Sekigahara, he was attended by Ii Naomasa and was therefore at the forefront of the fighting. In the midst of the battle, he was shot by an Ishida gunner, but survived with a bullet wound. He was given Kiyosue Domain afterwards and remained there until his death at 1607. He was buried in Shinnyo-ji in Kakegawa.

Family
 Father: Tokugawa Ieyasu
 Mother: Saigō-no-Tsubone
 Adopted Father: Matsudaira Ietada (Fukozu)
 Wife: Ii Masako
 Child: Umesada dai doji

References

1580 births
1607 deaths
Tokugawa clan